Mary Coffin Johnson (Coffin; July 15, 1834 - August 10, 1928) was an American activist and writer. She was acquainted with Abraham Lincoln, and was a friend of Henry Ward Beecher and his wife Eunice.

Biography
Mary Carol Coffin was born in North Carolina, July 15, 1834. Her parents, Elijah (a banker) and Naomi Coffin, were Quakers. Rhoda Coffin was a sister-in-law. 

At the age of 17, on March 31, 1858, she married Eli Johnson and went to Cincinnati, Ohio, to live for 10 years. At the age of 19, Johnson had been one of a board of managers of a large philanthropic work in Cincinnati. Her leaning toward this humanitarian work, she said, was the heritage from her Quaker parents, especially her mother.

In 1873, she moved to Brooklyn. The following year, Johnson served as the grand secretary and later as the vice-president of the First Woman's National Temperance Convention of the Woman's Christian Temperance Union (WCTU). She also became the first president of the Brooklyn WCTU, remaining in the position for nine years. Johnson became the publisher of the National WCTU's first newspaper, The Union Signal.

She was affiliated with Sorosis, Woman's Press Club of New York City (charter member and honorary vice-president) and  the Daughters of Ohio. She was an executive member for decades of the State board of the New York State Home Mission Union. In religion, she affiliated with the Plymouth Church of that city. Out of her work for the WCTU sprang the Wayside Home for women just out of prisons, which Johnson organized about 1887. In June 1912, she attended the General Federation of Women's Clubs convention in San Francisco, California.

Johnson broke her leg after falling in her home, and died three months later at the Harbor Sanitarium, Manhattan, August 10, 1928.

Selected works
 Gospel Temperance Songs (with Eli Johnson)
 The Higleys and their ancestry. An old colonial family, 1892
 Genealogical studies, 1895
 Biographical sketches of the Rambos of America, 1914
 M. Morris White, 1830-1913, 1917
 Charles F. Coffin, a Quaker pioneer, 1923

Notes

References

Attribution

Bibliography
 

1834 births
1928 deaths
19th-century American non-fiction writers
20th-century American non-fiction writers
19th-century American women writers
20th-century American women writers
Woman's Christian Temperance Union people
People from North Carolina
American biographers
Clubwomen